The Greenland argentine (Nansenia groenlandica) or large-eyed argentine is a species of pencil smelt fish.

Description

It has 9–10 dorsal soft rays and 8–10 anal soft rays. The ventral fins are inserted ahead of the dorsal fin, which is inserted in front of the midpoint of the body. It has 42–45 vertebrae and adults are silvery in colour, hence the name "argentine." The stomachs and peritoneum are coated with a dark pigment. It has 3 branchiostegal rays (bony rays supporting the gill membranes behind the lower jaw) and 7 or 8 pyloric caecae. It is also noted for its very large eyes.

Habitat

The Greenland argentine lives in the North Atlantic Ocean.

Behaviour

The Greenland argentine spawns mainly in spring and early summer.

References

Microstomatidae
Fish described in 1840